Holiday From Myself may refer to:

 Holiday From Myself (1934 film), a 1934 German comedy film
 Holiday From Myself (1952 film), a 1952 West German comedy film